Kim Hyeon-soo (also known as Kim Hyun-soo; born 1961) is a South Korean politician who served as the Minister of Agriculture, Food and Rural Affairs under President Moon Jae-in from 2019 to 2022. 

He was appointed as Minister three months after he resigned as Vice Minister -  the first deputy head of the Ministry under President Moon. He was previously its Deputy Minister, the Ministry's third highest ranking position after Minister and Vice Minister, under the preceding conservative president Park Geun-hye. 

After passing the state exam in 1986, he has spent the entire professional career in public service related to agriculture and trade - mostly at the Ministry. 

Kim holds three degrees - a bachelor in economics from Yonsei University, a master's in public administration from Seoul National University and a doctorate in agricultural economics from University of Wisconsin–Madison.

References 

1961 births
Living people
Yonsei University alumni
Seoul National University alumni
 University of Wisconsin–Madison College of Agricultural and Life Sciences alumni
People from Daegu
Government ministers of South Korea
Agriculture ministers